Quirrenbach may refer to:

 58098 Quirrenbach, a Hungaria asteroid
 Quirrenbach (Pleisbach), a river of North Rhine-Westphalia, Germany